{|

{{Infobox ship characteristics
|Hide header=
|Header caption=
|Ship class=*Fishing trawler (1925–39)
Vorpostenboot (1939–40)
|Ship type=
|Ship tonnage=, 
|Ship displacement=
|Ship length=
|Ship beam=
|Ship height=
|Ship draught=
|Ship depth=
|Ship decks=
|Ship deck clearance=
|Ship ramps=
|Ship ice class=
|Ship sail plan=
|Ship power=Triple expansion steam engine, 64nhp
|Ship propulsion=Single screw propeller
|Ship speed=
|Ship capacity=
|Ship crew=
|Ship notes=
}}
|}

V 304 Breslau was a German fishing trawler that was requisitioned in the Second World War by the Kriegsmarine for use as a vorpostenboot. Built in 1925 as Weser, she was renamed Breslau in 1939. She was wrecked at the entrance to the Noordzeekanaal in 1940.

Description
The engine was built by Seebeckwerft, Wesermünde, Germany. It was rated at 64nhp.

HistoryWeser was built as yard number 462 by Seebeckwerft, Wesermünde, Germanay for the Hochseefischerei Bremerhaven. She was launched in May 1925  and completed in July. The Code Letters QVKM were allocated, as was the fishing boat registration BX 178. On 7 June 1929, she was sold to the Nordsee Deutsche Hochseefischerei Bremen-Cuxhaven AG. Her registration was changed to ON 117. Her port of registry was changed to Nordenham. In 1934, her registration was changed to PG 467 and her Code Letters were changed to DNNS.Weser had been renamed Breslau by February 1939 and her port of registry was changed to Wesermünde. On 30 September, she was requisitioned by the Kriegsmarine for use as a vorpostenboot. She was allocated to 3 Vorpostenflotille as V 304 Breslau''. On 17 September 1940, she was wrecked in a storm at the entrance to the Noordzeekanaal near IJmuiden, North Holland, Netherlands with the loss of four of her crew. The wreck could still be seen in 1969 near the north mole at the entrance to the canal.

References

Sources

1925 ships
Ships built in Bremen (state)
Fishing vessels of Germany
Steamships of Germany
World War II merchant ships of Germany
Auxiliary ships of the Kriegsmarine
Maritime incidents in September 1940
World War II shipwrecks in the North Sea